89 Squadron or 89th Squadron may refer to:

 No. 89 Squadron RAF, a unit of the United Kingdom Royal Air Force 
 89th Flying Training Squadron, a unit of the United States Air Force 
 89th Airlift Squadron, a unit of the United States Air Force 
 89th Tactical Missile Squadron, a unit of the United States Air Force

See also
 89th Division (disambiguation)